Petrophila pavonialis is a moth in the family Crambidae. It was described by George Hampson in 1897. It is found in Peru.

References

Petrophila
Moths described in 1897
Moths of South America